Little Pink or Pinkie is a term used to describe young jingoistic Chinese nationalists on the internet.

The Little Pink are different from members of the 50 Cent Party or Internet Water Army, as the Little Pink are not paid. In terms of demographics, according to Zhuang Pinghui of South China Morning Post, 83% of the Little Pink are female, with most of them between 18 and 24 years old. More than half of the Little Pink are from third- and fourth-tier cities in China. They are primarily active on social media sites banned in China such as Twitter and Instagram. They have been compared to the Red Guards of the Cultural Revolution.

History 
The term Little Pink originated on the website , when a group of users kept strongly criticizing people who published posts containing negative news about China. Within Jinjiang Literature City, this group became known as the "Jinjiang Girl Group Concerned for the Country", or the Little Pink, which is the main color of the website's front page.

In the first days of the 2022 Russian invasion of Ukraine, the Little Pink drew international attention for their role in contributing to the mostly pro-war, pro-Russia sentiments on the Chinese internet.

Responses
The Chinese Communist Party's official newspaper People's Daily and its daily tabloid Global Times have both lavished praise on the Little Pink, as has the Communist Youth League of China.

In October 2021, the Little Pink were the subject of criticism by the satirical song "Fragile" by Malaysian singer Namewee and Australian singer Kimberley Chen. A commentary in the South China Morning Post opined that the song should have prompted, instead of the actual angry response by the Little Pink, a self-reflection on the dangers of their fervent nationalism. The commentary compared their path and its dangers to the one taken by supporters of Donald Trump in the 2021 United States Capitol attack.

See also
 Chinese information operations and information warfare
 Fenqing
 Patriotic Education Campaign
 Vatnik (slang)

References

Internet trolling
Political slurs for people
Internet-based activism
Chinese Internet slang
Chinese nationalism
2020 neologisms
Propaganda in China